Favio Brizuela (born 7 September 1997) is an Argentine professional footballer who plays as a midfielder for Nueva Chicago.

Career
Brizuela started out in Nueva Chicago's ranks. He was selected off the bench for his debut on 23 July 2017 for a Primera B Nacional match with Chacarita Juniors by manager Facundo Argüello, who then picked him to start a loss to San Martín one week later. Brizuela made two appearances in the 2016–17 season, which was followed by six more in 2017–18 as he also scored for the first time versus San Martín on 3 March 2018.

Career statistics
.

References

External links

1997 births
Living people
Place of birth missing (living people)
Argentine footballers
Association football midfielders
Primera Nacional players
Nueva Chicago footballers